Tan Sri Kamarul Ariffin bin Mohamed Yassin (born 12 August 1934) served as the Chairman of the World Scout Committee.

In 1983, he was awarded the 160th Bronze Wolf, the only distinction of the World Organization of the Scout Movement, awarded by the World Scout Committee for exceptional services to world Scouting, at the 25th World Scout Conference. He was also a recipient of the Silver World Award.

Honour

Honour of Malaysia
  : 
50px Commander of the Order of Loyalty to the Crown of Malaysia (P.S.M.) – Tan Sri (1981)

References

External links

Living people
Malaysian people of Malay descent
Malaysian Muslims
Recipients of the Bronze Wolf Award
1934 births
Scouting and Guiding in Malaysia
World Scout Committee members
Commanders of the Order of Loyalty to the Crown of Malaysia
Members of the Dewan Negara